Don Lope Ruiz de Esparza (c. 1569 – 14 August 1651) was a Basque nobleman, patriarch and early settler of Aguascalientes.

History
Don Lope Ruiz de Esparza was born in Pamplona, to a family of Basque nobility. It appears Lope Ruiz de Esparza was the first Esparza to come from Spain to New Spain. Many genealogists agree he may be the only Esparza to settle in New Spain and is the ancestor of all the Esparza families in early Mexico and the early U.S.  The surname Esparza is said to mean one who came from Esparza (a barren place or a place where feather grass grew) in Spain. The word was derived from the Latin  ('spread abroad, scattered'), probably referring to land that yields little. Esparza is the name of a village near Pamplona in Navarre, Spain.

It is very likely that the Ruiz de Esparza family of Aguascalientes could trace its roots back to that small village. After arriving in Mexico, Lope made his way to Aguascalientes, where about a year later, he is believed to have married (Ana) Francisca de Gabai Navarro y Moctezuma. In the following decades, the Ruiz de Esparza family intermarried extensively with other prominent Spanish families in early Aguascalientes, including Romo de Vivar, Macías Valadez, and Tiscareño de Molina..

His proof of nobility from the 16th century is displayed on one hundred and sixty pages on vellum with two coats of arms. His main arms were described in Spanish as: "" (seen right). It was presented on 27 April 1595, when the patriarch of New Spain, don Lope Ruiz de Esparza, appeared before the Mayor of Mexico City, Rafael de Trejo Carbajal, to present his ancestry: stating that he was the son of Lope Ruiz de Esparza and  Ana Díaz de Eguino, both of Pamplona. The elder Lope litigated his nobility in Pamplona stating his lordship over the palaces of Esparza and Zariquiegui, having won the lawsuit by judgment dated 23 November 1535. It was noted that the younger Lope was age twenty-six in 1595, was of average height, fair skin, with red beard and hair; his eyes were slightly sunken; and over the right brow he had a scar that ran almost to the cape of the brow and another larger scar that started at the inside of the cape of the right ear and ran to the middle of the neck; and was robust of limbs. Among the legal documents he presented were his Proof of Nobility from the Emperor Don Carlos and his mother Doña Juana. These Ruiz de Esparza, which later established themselves in Aguascalientes and from there were linked to Teocaltiche, Nochistlan, Tepatitlan, Arandas and other highland territories were linked with the Romo de Vivar, Gabay, Tiscareño, Escoto-Tovar and other old families of the region; in so doing they have extended their bloodline in a way that today there is no highland family that does not descend in some way from them.

Don Lope died in August 1651. He received the Holy sacraments and made his last will and testament dividing up his property and goods among his heirs. He also requested that a Novena of the Solemn High Mass for the dead be sung for the repose of his soul.

He was buried within the parish church of the village, beneath the altar of San Lorenzo, a privilege that was granted by the Lord Bishop Don Fray Francisco de Rivera on 18 January 1627 and confirmed by the Don Leonel de Cervantes on 19 September 1637.

Family

Don Lope Ruiz de Esparza married Ana Francisca de Gabay y Moctezuma, daughter of Martín de Gabay and  Petronila de Moctezuma, believed by most experts to be a direct lineal descendant of the last emperor of the Aztecs, Moctezuma II. Don Lope Ruiz de Esparza and Ana Francisca de Gabay y Moctezuma had at least 11 known children:  Ana Tomasina Ruiz de Esparza who married Francisco Sánchez Montes de Oca, Salvador Ruiz de Esparza who married María de Vielma,  Martín Ruiz de Esparza who married María López de Lizalde, Lorenza Ruiz de Esparza who married Captain Luis Tiscareño de Molina, Jacinto Ruiz de Esparza who married Juana López de Lizalde, Bernardo Ruiz de Esparza who married Catalina Lozano de Frías, María Ruiz de Esparza who married Nicolás de Ulloa, Cristóbal Ruiz de Esparza who married Isabel de Alcaraz, and Lorenzo Ruiz de Esparza who married first Antonia del Castillo and second Josefa de Sandi y Aguilera. 

Don Lope and his descendants would go on to make up some of the oldest and most prominent families of the Highlands of Jalisco and Aguascalientes within the ancient Kingdom of Nueva Galicia.

References

16th-century Mexican people
17th-century Mexican people
People from Pamplona
1651 deaths
Year of birth uncertain
16th-century nobility from the Kingdom of Navarre